Kosmos 2494 ( meaning Space 2494) is a  Russian military satellite launched in 2014 as part of the GLONASS satellite navigation system.

This satellite is a GLONASS-M satellite, also known as Uragan-M, and is numbered Uragan-M No. 754.

Kosmos 2494 was launched from Site 43/4  at Plesetsk Cosmodrome in northern Russia. A Soyuz-2-1b carrier rocket with a Fregat upper stage was used to perform the launch which took place at 22:54 UTC on 23 March 2014. The launch successfully placed the satellite into a Medium Earth orbit. It subsequently received its Kosmos designation, and the international designator 2014-012A. The United States Space Command assigned it the Satellite Catalog Number 39620.

The satellite is in orbital plane 3, in orbital slot 18. As of April 2014 it remains in service.

See also

 2014 in spaceflight
 List of Kosmos satellites (2251–2500)
 List of R-7 launches (2010–2014)

References

Spacecraft launched in 2014
Spacecraft launched by Soyuz-2 rockets
Kosmos satellites
2014 in Russia